Dendropsophus pelidna is a species of frog in the family Hylidae.
It is found in Colombia and Venezuela.
Its natural habitats are subtropical or tropical moist montane forests, subtropical or tropical high-altitude shrubland, freshwater marshes, intermittent freshwater marshes, plantations, rural gardens, heavily degraded former forest, and ponds.

References
 

pelidna
Amphibians of the Andes
Amphibians of Colombia
Amphibians of Venezuela
Amphibians described in 1989
Taxonomy articles created by Polbot
Taxobox binomials not recognized by IUCN